Alexander Munro MacRobert KC (1873 – 18 October 1930) was a Scottish lawyer and Unionist politician. He was Lord Advocate of Scotland in 1929.

Life

He was born in 1873 the son of Jean Carmichael and Thomas MacRobert.

He was educated at Paisley Grammar School, going on to study law at the University of Edinburgh and then the University of Glasgow graduating MA in 1895 and LLB in 1897. He became an advocate in 1897. In 1910 he was living at 86 Great King Street in Edinburgh's New Town.

He worked with the Admiralty in 1917–18 and as an Advocate Depute from 1919 to 1923. He was appointed King's Counsel in 1919. He was Sheriff of Forfar from 1923 to 1924.

He was an unsuccessful parliamentary candidate for Edinburgh Leith in 1922, and was elected for East Renfrewshire in October 1924 holding the seat until his death. He was appointed Solicitor General for Scotland in December 1925, and was promoted to serve as Lord Advocate briefly from May 1929 to June 1929.

He is buried in a line of law lords against the north wall of the 20th century extension to Dean Cemetery in Edinburgh, with his wife Emma Gentles.

References

External links 
 

1873 births
1930 deaths
People educated at Paisley Grammar School
Alumni of the University of Edinburgh
Alumni of the University of Glasgow
Unionist Party (Scotland) MPs
Members of the Parliament of the United Kingdom for Scottish constituencies
UK MPs 1924–1929
UK MPs 1929–1931
Scottish sheriffs
Solicitors General for Scotland
Lord Advocates
Place of birth missing
Members of the Privy Council of the United Kingdom